Michael Wasson (born 1990) is an American Nimíipuu poet from the town of Lenore, Idaho on the Nez Perce Reservation. He currently lives in Fukuoka, Japan.

Career 
Michael Wasson grew up on the Nez Perce reservation in Idaho, and recalls that landscape, his elders, and their stories and language as having a formative impact on his writing. He earned his BA studying literature, creative writing and his indigenous Nez Perce language, Nimipuutímt, at Lewis-Clark State College and an MFA in creative writing from Oregon State University while teaching writing courses. 
He has also taught literature, writing, and English in Tokyo, Japan, and he currently lives in Fukuoka, on the island of Kyushu, in Japan. He has been reported to have lived there since 2014 where he worked as an English and English Conversational teacher.

His work has also been used as an example in a short form creative writing anthology used to teach poetry and short fiction. His first book, This American Ghost, ranges across topics from classical Greek literature to the violence done by Christianity and colonialism to the cultural experiences of Nez Perce people.

Awards and nominations 
Wasson is the recipient of a Native Arts and Cultures Foundation National Artist Fellowship in Literature, the Adrienne Rich Award for Poetry, the Vinyl 45 Chapbook Prize, and the Joyce Carol Oates Commencement Award in Poetry. In 2019 he was awarded a Ruth Lilly and Dorothy Sargent Rosenberg Poetry Fellowship from the Poetry Foundation.

Publications 
 Swallowed Light (2021) – 
 This American Ghost (2017) –

References 

Living people
Native American poets
21st-century American poets
Poets from Idaho
Nez Perce people
American expatriates in Japan
1990 births